Uncial 0266 (in the Gregory-Aland numbering), is a Greek uncial manuscript of the New Testament. Paleographically it has been assigned to the 6th century.

Description 

The codex contains two small parts of the Gospel of Luke 20:19-25,30-39, on one parchment leaf (28 cm by 22 cm). It is survived in a fragmentary condition. It is written in one column per page, 33 lines per page, in uncial letters.

Currently it is dated by the INTF to the 6th century.

It was examined by Kurt Treu and Horseley.

Location 
Currently the codex is housed at the Berlin State Museums (P. 17034) in Berlin.

Text 
The Greek text of this codex is mixed. Aland placed it in Category III.

See also 

 List of New Testament uncials
 Textual criticism

References

Further reading 

 Kurt Treu, "Neue Neutestamentliche Fragmente der Berliner Papyrussammlung", APF 18 (Berlin: 1966), pp. 23-38. 
 G. H. R. Horseley, "New Documents Illustrating Early Christianity" 2 (Macquarie University, 1982), pp. 125-140. 

Greek New Testament uncials
6th-century biblical manuscripts